Venadu is an island village in Nellore district of the Indian state of Andhra Pradesh. It is located in Tada mandal and surrounded by Pulicat Lake.

References

Villages in Nellore district
Islands of Andhra Pradesh
Islands of India
Populated places in India